Karlos Jermell Williams Sr. (born May 4, 1993) is a former American football running back. He was drafted by the Buffalo Bills in the fifth round of the 2015 NFL Draft. He played college football at Florida State.

Early years
Williams attended Ridge Community High School in Davenport, Florida, where he was a three-sport star in football, track and basketball. He played safety and running back. He was a five-star recruit by Rivals.com and was ranked as the second best safety and eighth best player overall in his class.

He was also a track star in high school. He won the 200-meter dash event at the 2010 East County Track Meet with a time of 22.49 seconds. He placed 5th in the 100 meters at the 2011 FHSAA 3A Championships with a time of 10.7 seconds. He was timed at 10.5 seconds in the 100-meter dash as a senior.

College career
Williams played safety his first two years at Florida State. As a true freshman in 2011, he played in 12 games as a backup safety and return specialist. He missed the teams bowl game due to a broken wrist he suffered in the final regular season game. As a sophomore in 2012, he again was a backup and return specialist. He played in 14 games and made one start. Williams entered his junior season in 2013 as a safety, but was moved to running back after the first game. His first career carry was a 65-yard touchdown run against the Nevada Wolf Pack. During the 2014 BCS National Championship Game against Auburn he rushed for 25 yards on five carries, including a seven-yard fake punt conversion on fourth-and-four. He finished the year with 730 rushing yards and 11 rushing touchdowns on 91 carries. In 2014, Williams began his senior season as the starter, but eventually played behind Dalvin Cook. He finished the year with 689 yards on 150 carries with 11 touchdowns.

Professional career

Buffalo Bills
Williams was drafted by the Buffalo Bills in the fifth round (155th overall) of the 2015 NFL Draft. Just as his first carry in college was for a touchdown, Williams's first carry in the NFL was a 26-yard touchdown run for the Bills against the Indianapolis Colts.

In Week 3 against the Miami Dolphins, Williams surpassed 100 yards rushing for the first time in his career. He ran for 110 yards and two touchdowns on just twelve carries, including a 41-yard scoring run.

Williams missed three games after suffering a concussion against the New York Giants in Week 4. He returned in a Week 9 rematch against the Dolphins.

On November 8, 2015, Williams ran for a career-high 2 touchdowns against the Miami Dolphins.

In Buffalo's Week 10 win over the New York Jets, Williams tied a record held by former New England Patriots running back Robert Edwards by reaching the end zone in his sixth consecutive game to start his career.

On August 20, 2016, Williams was released by the Bills after reportedly showing up to training camp out of shape and was later suspended four games for violating the NFL's substance abuse policy.

Pittsburgh Steelers
On October 11, 2016, Williams was signed to the Pittsburgh Steelers' practice squad. On November 23, 2016, Williams was suspended 10 games for violating the NFL's substance abuse policy. He signed a reserve/future contract with the Steelers on January 24, 2017 after his suspension was lifted. He was released by the Steelers on March 9, 2017.

On June 28, 2017, Williams was suspended for at least one year for violating the NFL Policy and Program for Substances of Abuse for a third time. He was reinstated from suspension on February 21, 2019.

Toronto Argonauts
Williams signed a futures contract for the 2020 CFL season with the Toronto Argonauts on November 15, 2019. He signed a contract extension with the team on December 14, 2020.

On April 27, 2021, Williams announced his retirement from professional football.

Personal life
His brother, Vince Williams played college football at Florida State and played as a linebacker for the Pittsburgh Steelers.

He is a cousin of Derwin James.

Williams has seven children: two  daughters, Kylie and Kota, and five sons, Karlos Jr., Kobi, Kason, Korri, and Karter. His son, Kason, was diagnosed with Hirschsprung's disease in early 2017.

References

External links
Florida State Seminoles bio
Rotoworld profile

1993 births
Living people
African-American players of American football
American football running backs
American football safeties
American football return specialists
Buffalo Bills players
Florida State Seminoles football players
People from Davenport, Florida
Pittsburgh Steelers players
Players of American football from Florida
Sportspeople from Polk County, Florida
Toronto Argonauts players
21st-century African-American sportspeople